Alix Bushnell is a New Zealand actress, best known for her role as "Britta McMann" on the television series, Go Girls.

Early life
Her first celebrity crush was Leonardo DiCaprio when she was fourteen, and her favourite school subjects were English and Music. She has an interest in 16th century costume and culture.

Bushnell enjoys walking her dog, going to the gym, hanging out with friends and reading.
Bushnell has one son.

Career
Despite a role in the 1994 film, Bread and Roses, Bushnell's early focus was on her musical career; her musical abilities had been recognized by her mother at the age of eight, and Bushnell studied piano and classical singing until her early twenties, when she began to feel stifled by the rigid structure of classical music, and consequently turned her creative focus to acting.

Bushnell auditioned and gained a place at the prestigious New Zealand Drama School: Toi Whakaari. She won the role of Britta McMann, five months before graduating.

Filmography

Awards
Go Girls won best NZ drama at the 2012 New Zealand Television Awards.

Alix Bushnell nominated for Aotearoa Film & Television Awards-Finalist Best Supporting Actress in a Feature Film 2011

Best on the Box Award 2010

External links

References

Living people
1983 births
New Zealand actresses
New Zealand television actresses